Acacia arcuatilis is a shrub belonging to the genus Acacia and the subgenus Juliflorae that is endemic to south western parts of Australia.

Description
The sericeous branchlets have red-brown or yellow-brown resin-ribs at the extremities. Like most species of Acacia it has phyllodes rather than true leaves. The evergreen shallowly to strongly incurved phyllodes occasionally curl back to a full circle. There are usually eight wide and flat topped nerves per face. It flowers from June to August producing spherical yellow flowers. Following flowering thinly coriaceous seed pods for that have a linear shape but are slightly raised over and constricted between each of the seeds.

Distribution
It is native to areas of the Wheatbelt and the Great Southern regions of Western Australia. The plant will grown in loam, sand or lateritic soils and is often found on the plains or rises. The bulk of the population is found around Bindi Bindi in the north down to around Ongerup in the south and as far east as Hyden where is most often a part of open mallee  scrub and less frequently open heath communities.

See also
List of Acacia species

References

arcuatilis
Acacias of Western Australia
Plants described in 1999
Taxa named by Bruce Maslin